My Lord What a Mornin' is an album of spirituals sung by Harry Belafonte and released by RCA Victor in 1960. The album was reissued in 1995 with additional bonus tracks.

Track listing 
 "Wake up Jacob" (Harry Belafonte, Gene Corman, Milton Okun) – 1:55
 "My Lord, What a Mornin'" (Belafonte, Corman, Okun) – 4:27
 "Ezekiel" (Traditional) – 3:41
 "'Buked and Scorned" (Belafonte, Corman) – 4:45
 "Stars Shinin' (By 'N By)" (Belafonte, Corman, Okun) – 1:38
 "Oh, Freedom" (Belafonte, Corman, Okun) – 3:22
 "Were You There When They Crucified My Lord?" (Traditional) – 4:38
 "Oh, Let Me Fly" (Belafonte, Corman, Okun) – 2:11
 "Swing Low" (Traditional) – 4:02
 "March Down to Jordan" (Belafonte, Okun, Ned Wright) – 3:28
 "Steal Away" – 3:47
 1995 reissue bonus tracks:
 "All My Trials" (Traditional, Carter, Greene) – 4:04
 "Michael Row the Boat Ashore" (Traditional) – 3:59
 "Go Down Emanuel Road" (Irving Burgie) – 3:12
 "In My Father's House" – 3:37
 "Goin' Down Jordan" (Theophilus Woods) – 3:38

Personnel 
 Harry Belafonte – vocals
 The Belafonte Folk Singers – vocals
Production notes:
 Bob Bollard – producer
 Conducted by Bob Corman
 Bob Simpson – engineer
 Herschel Levit – cover art
 Langston Hughes – liner notes

Chart positions

References 

1960 albums
Harry Belafonte albums
RCA Records albums
Folk albums by American artists
Albums conducted by Robert De Cormier